The 2005 Australian motorcycle Grand Prix was the fifteenth round of the 2005 MotoGP Championship. It took place on the weekend of 13–15 October 2005 at the Phillip Island Grand Prix Circuit. It was also the final victory for Valentino Rossi at Phillip Island until the 2014 event.

MotoGP classification

250 cc classification

125 cc classification

Championship standings after the race (motoGP)

Below are the standings for the top five riders and constructors after round fifteen has concluded.

Riders' Championship standings

Constructors' Championship standings

 Note: Only the top five positions are included for both sets of standings.

References

Australian motorcycle Grand Prix
Australian
Motorcycle
Motorsport at Phillip Island